Mollohan Mill is a historic grist mill located near Replete, Webster County, West Virginia.  It was built in 1894, and is a two-story frame gable-roofed building on a cut stone foundation.  It is constructed of hewn post and beam timber construction and measures 38 feet long and 23 feet wide.  The Mollohan Mill operated from 1894 until 1953.

It was listed on the National Register of Historic Places in 1982.

References

External links
WCHS-8, Mollohan Mill: A historic spot in Webster County video

Grinding mills on the National Register of Historic Places in West Virginia
Industrial buildings completed in 1894
Buildings and structures in Webster County, West Virginia
Grinding mills in West Virginia
National Register of Historic Places in Webster County, West Virginia